The Battle of Anjar was fought on 1 November 1623 between the army of Fakhr al-Din II and an coalition army led by the governor of Damascus Mustafa Pasha.

Background
In 1623, Yunus al-Harfush prohibited the Druze of the Chouf from cultivating their lands in the southern Beqaa, angering Fakhr al-Din. In August/September 1623 he stationed  in the southern Beqaa village of Qabb Ilyas and evicted the Harfushes. Meanwhile, in June or July, the imperial authorities had replaced Fakhr al-Din's son Ali as sanjak-bey of Safed and replaced his other son Husayn and Mustafa Kethuda as the sanjak-beys of Ajlun and Nablus respectively with local opponents of Fakhr al-Din. The imperial authorities soon after restored the Ma'ns to Ajlun and Nablus, but not to Safed. The Ma'ns thereupon moved to assume control of Ajlun and Nablus, prompting Yunus al-Harfush to call on the janissary leader Kurd Hamza, who wielded significant influence over the beylerbey of Damascus, Mustafa Pasha, to block their advance. Kurd Hamza then secured Yunus al-Harfush's appointment to Safed, followed by a failed attempt by Fakhr al-Din to outbid him for the governorship.

Fakhr al-Din launched a campaign against the Turabays and Farrukhs in northern Palestine, but was defeated in a battle at the Awja River near Ramla. On his way back to Mount Lebanon from the abortive Palestine campaign, Fakhr al-Din was notified that the imperial government had reappointed his sons and allies to Safed, Ajlun, and Nablus. The reversal was linked to the successions of Sultan Murad IV and Grand Vizier Kemankeş Ali Pasha, the latter of whom had been bribed by Fakhr al-Din's agent in Constantinople to restore the Ma'ns to their former sanjaks. Mustafa Pasha and Kurd Hamza, nonetheless, proceeded to launch an expedition against the Ma'ns. Fakhr al-Din arrived in Qabb Ilyas on 22 October, and immediately moved to restore lost money and provisions from the Palestine campaign by raiding the nearby villages of Karak Nuh and Sar'in, both held by the Harfushes.

The battle
Afterward, the Damascenes, the Harfushes, and the Sayfas set out from Damascus, while Fakhr al-Din mobilized his Druze fighters, and Shia levies. He sent the Shihabs to serve as his vanguard in the tower of Anjar, but by the time Fakhr al-Din arrived there in early November 1623, the Shihabs had been driven off and the Sayfas and Harfushes had taken over the tower. Fakhr al-Din immediately routed the Damascene janissaries at Anjar and captured Mustafa Pasha, while Kurd Hamza and Yunus al-Harfush escaped to Aleppo. Fakhr al-Din extracted from the beylerbey confirmation of the Ma'ns' governorships, his appointment over Gaza Sanjak, his son Mansur over Lajjun Sanjak, and Ali over the southern Beqaa . The appointments to Gaza, Nablus and Lajjun were not implemented due to the opposition of local powerholders.

Aftermath
Afterward, Fakhr al-Din secured from Mustafa Pasha the governorship of the Zabadani  for his Shihab proxy Qasim ibn Ali, while the Bekaa-i Azizi was temporarily reconfirmed to Yunus Harfush's son Ali. By March, Fakhr al-Din turned against Mustafa Pasha in favor of his replacement, but Mustafa Pasha was reinstated in April. Relations between Fakhr al-Din and Mustafa Pasha subsequently soured.

See also
 Druze power struggle (1658–67)
 List of conflicts in the Near East

References

1623 in Asia
1623 in the Ottoman Empire
17th century in Ottoman Syria
Anjar
Anjar
Anjar
History of Lebanon